The City of Pleasure  is Ezzat el Kamhawi's first novel, and second book after It Happened in the land of Dust and Mud (stories). It was first released by the General Organization for Cultural Centers in 1997, second edition by el-Ain publishing in 2009. In his novel, Kamhawi attempted to personify an entire city where he deals with issues related to love and sex. The characters are portrayed as simple passerby who narrate the city's story and who live in it, with it and for it.

Plot
A city like no other, guarded by the goddess of pleasure and, ruled by a licentious king who dedicated his time to carnal pleasures and a princess who dreams of love and tender empathy. The priests decide to design the walls of the princess's room with figures of embracing lovers and burnt incense and chanted their magical incantations that the pictures on the wall may come to life and the dream of the princess for true love might come true.

People real and shadowy, strong slaves and emperors have met their doom at the gates of the City of Pleasure. Eventually the gates of the impenetrable city succumbs under the charm of two ingenious commodities: fried potatoes and pepsi-cola. No one knows the real history of the City of Pleasure and no welcome visitor has ever escaped its enchantment.

This is the novel that has been structured from human myths melted down and recreated one of the most perfectly executed literary whims. It is no longer possible to speak of modern Arabic literary narrative without including The City of Pleasure and the enriching addition it has provided to the art of the modern Arabic novel par excellence.

Quotes
Gamal El-Ghitani: 

Abdel Rahman el-Abnudi: 

Mohamed Abd al-Muttalib: 

Nabil Soliman:

References

External links
 el-Ain publishing website
 el-kamhawi's Facebook group

1997 novels
Arabic-language novels
Novels by Ezzat el Kamhawi
1997 debut novels